James Edward Ware (May 2, 1944 – January 1986) was an American professional basketball player.

Ware was born in Natchez, Mississippi and attended Oklahoma City University, where he was a forward on the basketball team. In 1966, he led the nation in rebounding, with an average of 20.9 per game.

Ware was drafted later that year by the National Basketball Association's Cincinnati Royals. After the 1966–67 season, he was drafted by the San Diego Rockets in the expansion draft. He played just one season for San Diego. Ware was mostly a backup player in the NBA.

See also
List of NCAA Division I men's basketball season rebounding leaders

References

1944 births
1986 deaths
American men's basketball players
Basketball players from Mississippi
Cincinnati Royals draft picks
Cincinnati Royals players
Dallas Chaparrals players
Hamden Bics players
Oklahoma City Stars men's basketball players
People from Natchez, Mississippi
Power forwards (basketball)
San Diego Rockets players
Sportspeople from Natchez, Mississippi
Wilkes-Barre Barons players